Women Talking is a 2022 American drama film written and directed by Sarah Polley. It is based on the 2018 novel of the same name by Miriam Toews, and inspired by the gas-facilitated rapes that occurred at the Manitoba Colony, a remote and isolated Mennonite community in Bolivia. It features an ensemble cast that includes Rooney Mara, Claire Foy, Jessie Buckley, Judith Ivey, Ben Whishaw, and Frances McDormand, who also served as a producer on the film.

Women Talking premiered at the 49th Telluride Film Festival on September 2, 2022, and was released in the United States via select theaters on December 23, 2022, before a wide release on January 27, 2023, by United Artists Releasing. The film received positive reviews from critics, who lauded Polley's screenplay and direction, the performances of the cast (particularly of Foy, Buckley, and Whishaw) and score. It was named one of the top ten films of 2022 by the National Board of Review and the American Film Institute, won Best Adapted Screenplay at the 28th Critics' Choice Awards, 75th Writers Guild of America Awards, and the 95th Academy Awards where it was also nominated for Best Picture.

Plot
A young woman sleeps alone, in bed. There are visible bruises and wounds on her hips and upper inner thighs—injuries sustained from rape.

In 2010, the women and girls of an unnamed, isolated Mennonite colony discover that the men have been using cow tranquilizer to subdue and rape them. The attackers are arrested and imprisoned in a nearby city. Most of the men of the colony travel to oversee the bail, leaving the women by themselves for two days to determine how they will proceed. They hold a plebiscite to decide whether to stay and do nothing, stay and fight, or leave.

The vote is tied between staying and fighting, and leaving. Eleven of the colony's women band together at a hayloft to come to a final decision, though Scarface, a "do-nothing" woman, leaves the meeting after becoming disillusioned with the discussion, taking her hesitant daughter Anna and resistant granddaughter Helena with her. August, the colony's schoolteacher and one of two remaining men, joins the women to record the meeting, as none of the women were taught to read or write. The second man is Melvin, a transgender man who after being raped does not speak, except to the young children. Therefore, he is left in charge of watching over them and warning the women of any outside developments.

Salome, just back from a trip to gather antibiotics for her little daughter who was assaulted, remains adamant about staying and fighting, an opinion shared by Mejal. Ona, who is pregnant after being raped, also suggests that they stay and, after winning the fight, create a new set of rules for the colony that would give the women equality. Mariche, Greta's daughter and Autje's mother, disagrees, believing that forgiveness is the only viable option. To defuse the conflict, Ona suggests that August create one document stating the pros and cons of leaving, and another document doing the same for staying.

The meeting is adjourned. During the break, it is revealed that August is from an excommunicated family, but was recently granted permission to return so that he could be a teacher to the boys of the colony. He and Ona were good childhood friends, and he has had romantic feelings for her since.

When the women are counted for the 2010 census, they learn that Klaas, Mariche's abusive husband, will return that evening to collect more bail money. The meeting resumes. Ona and Mejal change their minds in favor of leaving. Salome remains insistent upon fighting, angrily confessing that she would rather kill the men than put her daughter in further harm's way. However, she changes her opinion after being reminded by Agata, her mother as well as Ona's, of the principles of their faith. The only remaining unconvinced member is Mariche. An argument ensues between her and the rest of the women; it is revealed that she forgave her husband's abuse at Greta's urging. After Greta apologizes, Mariche agrees to leave.

Their reasons for leaving are transcribed by August: to ensure the safety of their children, to be steadfast in their faith, and to have freedom of thought. They decide to try to take boys aged fifteen years and younger with them, but will not force any boy over age twelve. They prepare to leave at sunrise, concealing their plans from Klaas. August, at Ona's behest, posts the documents stating the pros and cons of leaving and staying on the walls as an "artifact" of the women's time in the colony. He also declares his love to Ona and gives her a map for the women to use.

Before they can leave, Melvin tells Salome that her teenage son Aaron has fled and hidden. He is found, but cannot be convinced to leave in enough time. Salome, breaking the rules of their departure, tranquillizes Aaron, forcing him to leave with them. She reveals this only to August, who understands and does not question her. He asks her to look after Ona and reveals his intent to kill himself once the women are gone. She instead asks him to teach the boys properly to prevent any further violence and to give him purpose. Helena and Anna join the rest of the women, while Scarface and August watch on as they depart.

Cast

Production

In December 2020, it was reported that Frances McDormand would star in the film, which would be written and directed by Sarah Polley. In June 2021, Ben Whishaw, Rooney Mara, Claire Foy, Jessie Buckley, Judith Ivey, Sheila McCarthy and Michelle McLeod joined the cast of the film. Hildur Guðnadóttir composed the film's score.

Principal photography took place from July 19 to September 10, 2021 in Toronto,  Canada, with COVID-19 safety precautions in place. Costume designer Quita Alfred procured some fabric and prayer coverings from an actual Mennonite community store, using differing colors and patterns for each family to represent certain traits they held as a unit.

Women Talking is the last film released by UAR before Amazon ceased the distributor's operations and folded it into MGM, Orion's parent company.

Music

Hildur Guðnadóttir composed the film's score, with Skúli Sverrisson providing guitar solos. The soundtrack was among the inaugural titles released through Universal Music Group's label Mercury Classics Soundtrack & Score, which was released this film's soundtrack digitally on December 23, 2022, the same day as the start of the film's limited theatrical release. It was released on physical CD later that month. The score cue "Speak Up," which served as the basis for the film's trailer music, was released digitally on November 4, 2022.

The 1967 song "Daydream Believer" performed by The Monkees was featured in the film, however it is not included on the soundtrack.

Release
The film had its world premiere at the Telluride Film Festival on September 2, 2022. It also screened at the 2022 Toronto International Film Festival on September 13, 2022, followed by screenings at the 60th New York Film Festival on October 10, 2022 and at the 2022 AFI Fest on November 5, 2022. It began its limited theatrical release in the United States and Canada on December 23, 2022 by Orion Pictures (through United Artists Releasing), with a wide expansion on January 27, 2023. It was originally scheduled for a limited release on December 2, 2022, but was moved to December 23 to avoid competition with Avatar: The Way of Water.

The film was released for VOD on February 21, 2023, followed by a Blu-ray and DVD release on March 7, 2023.

Reception

Box office

, Women Talking has grossed $5.5 million in the United States and Canada, and $2.9 million in other territories, for a worldwide total of $8.3 million.

On the first weekend of its limited theatrical release, it grossed $40,530 from 8 theaters, making it the worst platform opening of the year. Deadline cited the proximity of Christmas, the nationwide impact of Winter Storm Elliott, and the general public no longer showing support for prestige films as contributing factors. It expanded to 707 theatres in the nationwide expansion, grossing $970,469 with $1,372 avenue at the box office until it drop out on nationwide second weekend with $558,071, finishing fifteenth 2 times.

Critical response

On the review aggregator website Rotten Tomatoes, the film holds an approval rating of 90% based on 282 reviews, with an average rating of 8/10. The site's critics consensus reads: "While Women Talking sometimes forsakes entertaining drama in favor of simply getting its points across, its message is valuable -- and effectively delivered." On Metacritic, the film has a weighted average score of 79 out of 100 based on 47 critics, indicating "generally favorable reviews."

Peter Debruge from Variety called the film a "powerful act of nonviolent protest". In a review following the Telluride Film Festival, Justin Chang from Los Angeles Times described the film as "a movie that deliberately hovers between drama and parable, the materially concrete and the spiritually abstract, and whose stark austerity sometimes gives way to bursts of salty wit and cathartic laughter".

Accolades 

Polley received the Telluride Film Festival Silver Medallion tribute award. Composer Hildur Guðnadóttir received a tribute award at the 2022 Toronto International Film Festival. At the 95th Academy Awards the film was nominated for Best Picture and Polley won the award for Best Adapted Screenplay. It was also nominated for Best Screenplay and Best Original Score at the 80th Golden Globe Awards, Best Ensemble Cast of a Motion Picture at the 29th Screen Actors Guild Awards, and received 6 nominations at the 28th Critics' Choice Awards, including Best Picture.

References

External links
 
 
 Official screenplay

2022 films
2022 drama films
2020s American films
2020s English-language films
American drama films
Films about rape
Films about abuse
Films about child abuse
Films about domestic violence
Films based on Canadian novels
Films directed by Sarah Polley
Films impacted by the COVID-19 pandemic
Films scored by Hildur Guðnadóttir
Films set in the 2010s
Films set in 2010
Films set in Bolivia
Films shot in Toronto
Films with screenplays by Sarah Polley
Mennonitism in films
Orion Pictures films
Plan B Entertainment films
2022 independent films
Drama films based on actual events
Sexual abuse scandals in Evangelicalism
Films whose writer won the Best Adapted Screenplay Academy Award